Christoph Gilli (17 June 1963 – 26 May 2010) was a Swiss football defender.

References

1963 births
2010 deaths
Swiss men's footballers
FC Aarau players
AC Bellinzona players
FC Zürich players
FC Luzern players
Association football defenders
Swiss Super League players
Switzerland international footballers